The 2003 Hawaii Warriors football team represented the University of Hawaii at Manoa in the 2003 NCAA Division I-A football season. Hawaii finished the 2003 season with a 9–5 record, going 6–2 in Western Athletic Conference (WAC) play. The Warriors made their second straight appearance in the Hawaii Bowl, facing off against Houston. The Warriors capped off their second straight winning season, and the fourth in five seasons, under head coach June Jones with a bowl win.

Schedule

Statistics
 QB Timmy Chang: 353/601 (58.7%) for 4,198 yards and 29 touchdowns vs. 20 interceptions. 43 carries for -60 yards and 1 touchdown.
 QB Jason Whieldon: 88/147 (59.9%) for 1,131 yards and 12 touchdowns vs. 6 interceptions. 33 carries for 129 yards and 1 touchdown.
 RB John West: 64 carries for 422 yards and 4 touchdowns. 15 catches for 116 yards and 1 touchdown.
 RB Michael Brewster: 54 carries for 405 yards and 2 touchdowns. 33 catches for 363 yards and 2 touchdowns.
 RB Michael Bass: 53 carries for 307 yards and 3 touchdowns. 14 catches for 137 yards and 0 touchdowns.
 RB West Keliikipi: 37 carries for 247 yards and 6 touchdowns. 20 catches for 154 yards and 1 touchdown.
 WR Chad Owens: 85 catches for 1,134 yards and 9 touchdowns.
 WR Britton Komine: 53 catches for 602 yards and 5 touchdowns.
 WR Jason Rivers: 48 catches for 594 yards and 5 touchdowns.
 WR Gerald Welch: 43 catches for 462 yards and 4 touchdowns.
 WR Se'e Poumele: 29 catches for 330 yards and 2 touchdowns.
 WR Clifton Herbert: 11 catches for 186 yards and 2 touchdowns.

References

Hawaii
Hawaii Rainbow Warriors football seasons
Hawaii Bowl champion seasons
Hawaii Warriors football